The Robinson Correctional Institution  is a minimum-security (2018) state prison for men located in Robinson, Crawford County, Illinois, owned and operated by the Illinois Department of Corrections.  

The facility was first opened in 1991, and has a working capacity of 1223.

References

External links 

 local news segment "An Inside Look at the Robinson Correctional Institution"

Prisons in Illinois
Buildings and structures in Crawford County, Illinois
1991 establishments in Illinois